Anna Kashfi (born Joan O'Callaghan; 30 September 1934 – 16 August 2015) was a British film actress who had a brief Hollywood career in the 1950s but was better known for her tumultuous marriage to film star Marlon Brando and the controversies surrounding their son.

Early life 
Kashfi was born in Chakradharpur, India, to William Patrick O'Callaghan, a traffic superintendent on the Indian State railways, who was a Londoner of Irish descent, and his Welsh wife, Phoebe. She was raised in Calcutta until she was 13, when the family relocated to Cardiff, Wales.

Family background
By the age of 22 Joan O'Callaghan had transformed herself into the exotic ethnic Indian model and actress Anna Kashfi, using a name invented by her and Glyn Mortimer, the head of a London modelling agency. As Mortimer told Parade magazine for its 1959 investigation into Kashfi's past, "Kashfi was the name of a dear friend of mine. Joan picked the name Anna from Joanna, which she apparently had used from time to time".

The matter of Kashfi's ethnic heritage has remained in question. Both her British-born parents maintained she was their biological daughter, born, her father told Parade magazine in 1959, "to my wife in 1934 when I was employed by the Bengal-Nagupur railway as a station master". Parade stated that its investigation determined that "her baptismal certificate bears this out" and furthermore stated that she had a brother, Bosco Brian Patrick O'Callaghan, who was then attending a technical college in Cardiff.

However, upon her 1957 marriage to Marlon Brando a year after adopting her stage name, Kashfi failed to list either on her marriage license, instead stating her real father was one Devi Kashfi and biological mother named Selma Ghose. In a 14 October 1957, wedding day interview with The New York Times (entitled "Kashfi Still Enigma: License Does Not List Welsh Couple As Parents"), a friend of the bride was quoted as stating that Kashfi's purported Indian father had died six weeks before the ceremony.

Nevertheless, the O'Callaghans were adamant that Kashfi was their child, and William O'Callaghan was quoted in Time magazine as saying, "That's our daughter, and both me and missus were born in London."  

Parade reported that Kashfi might have selected the surname "Ghose" for her putative mother from the owners of The Maharajah, a London shop where she worked as a model. She also worked as a model in the London fur salon of Henry Noble in Regent Street.

In her 1979 book, Brando for Breakfast, Kashfi retreated halfway and claimed she is half-Indian, maintaining that  William O'Callaghan was her stepfather. She claimed her biological father was Indian and she was the result of an "unregistered alliance" between him and her mother. However, when questioned earlier in life about her daughter's heritage, her mother had told the press "There is no Indian blood in my family or my husband's family". Film director Edward Dmytryk, who directed the actress in her first film, stated in a New York Times interview (titled "Kashfi Called Welsh") the day before her wedding to Brando that he knew her real surname was Irish but assumed she was half-Indian.

Career 
Upon her family's relocation to Wales, O'Callaghan worked as a waitress and in a butcher's shop in Cardiff before moving to London, where she became a model. She made her screen debut as an actress in 1956 in The Mountain (1956) for Paramount with Spencer Tracy and Robert Wagner.  Using the stage name Anna Kashfi, the twenty-two-year-old played a Hindu girl. In her next film a year later, Battle Hymn (1957), she co-starred with Rock Hudson as a Korean girl. A year after that she played a Mexican in Cowboy (1958) with Glenn Ford and Jack Lemmon. Her next and last film during this period was Night of the Quarter Moon (1959), where she played the African American wife of singer Nat King Cole and for which she received the Best Supporting Actress Award at the Cartagena Film Festival in 1961. She made a few appearances on television, including the series Adventures in Paradise, though drug and alcohol problems reportedly contributed to the premature end of her acting career.

Personal life 
Kashfi married Marlon Brando, whom she had met in the summer of 1956, on 11 October 1957. They divorced a year and a half later on 22 April 1959.

They had a son, Christian Devi Brando (1958–2008), whom she called "Devi". Kashfi and Marlon fought bitterly over Christian, with Marlon eventually winning custody. In the 1990s, Christian was tried for killing his half-sister Cheyenne's boyfriend.  Jailed for the crime, he later died of pneumonia in Los Angeles in 2008, aged 49.  Kashfi married James Hannaford, a salesman, in 1974.

Death 
Kashfi died on 16 August 2015, in Woodland, Washington, aged 80.

Books 
 Anna K. Brando and E. P. Stein, Brando for Breakfast, Berkley Pub Group, 1980, .

Filmography 
 The Mountain (1956) – Hindu Girl
 Battle Hymn (1957) – En Soon Yang
 Cowboy (1958) – Maria Vidal / Arriega
 Night of the Quarter Moon (1959) – Maria Robbin

Television appearances 
 Adventures in Paradise (1959) – Monique Le Febure
 The Deputy (1960) – Felipa
 Bronco (1960) – Princess Natula

References

Bibliography 
 Peter Manso, Brando. The Biography, Hyperion, New York, 1994,

External links 

 
 Anna Kashfi bio
 Anna Kashfi 'cried tears of rage' upon hearing of Marlon Brando's death
 

1934 births
2015 deaths
British film actresses
British people of Irish descent
British people of Welsh descent
Actresses from Cardiff
British emigrants to the United States
20th-century British actresses
20th-century American actresses
People from Kalama, Washington
Brando family